David Cowell (1704–1760) was a Presbyterian minister and briefly the acting president of Princeton University. A graduate of Harvard in 1732, Cowell was a trustee of the college. He was the acting president from 1757 to 1758 and also oversaw the negotiations that led to Samuel Davies becoming the fourth president of the college. He was the first pastor of the First Presbyterian Church in Trenton, New Jersey, serving from 1736 to 1760. He died in 1760 and was buried in the churchyard of First Presbyterian Church.

References

Citations

Works cited 
 

1704 births
1760 deaths
Harvard College alumni
Presidents of Princeton University
18th-century American clergy
American Presbyterian ministers